The Running River rainbowfish (Melanotaenia sp., also known as the Burdekin rainbowfish, Hidden Valley rainbowfish or zig zag rainbowfish) is an undescribed species of rainbowfish found only in Running River, part of the Burdekin River catchment in northern Queensland, Australia.

Taxonomy

Although discovered in 1982 by Ray Leggett, the species was never formally described as its taxonomy was unclear. However, genetic analysis supports the Running River rainbowfish as a distinct species, rather than a colour variety of the eastern rainbowfish.

Conservation

In the wild, the Running River rainbowfish is confined to a 13 km stretch of Running River, isolated between two gorges. In August 2015, ecologists Peter Unmack and Michael Hammer discovered that eastern rainbowfish had been introduced into the upper section of Running River, and were hybridising and introgressing with the Running River rainbowfish. Due to this hybridisation threat, the Australian Society for Fish Biology listed the Running River rainbowfish as critically endangered in September 2016.

In August 2015, researchers from the University of Canberra and James Cook University began a captive breeding program using 'pure' Running River rainbowfish captured from the wild. By September 2016, they had bred about 3000 individuals. These captive-bred fish are being released into two nearby tributaries, Deception Creek and Puzzle Creek, beginning in November 2016.

References

Running River rainbowfish
Freshwater fish of Queensland
Undescribed vertebrate species